Dragan Živadinov, (born January 24, 1960 in Ilirska Bistrica) is a Slovenian theatre director.

Studied theatrical direction at the Academy of Music, Radio, Television and Film in Ljubljana from 1980 to 1984. He was a cofounder of the art movement Neue Slowenische Kunst (1985). In the 1980s he constructed the style formation retro-gardism. In 1983 he founded the retro-garde Scipion Nasice Sisters Theatre and, in 1987, the cosmokinetic observatory Red Pilot. In the early 1990s he transformed Red Pilot into the Noordung Cosmokinetic Cabinet. In 1995 he embarked on the fifty-year theatrical process Noordung 1995–2045 through the style formation of telecosmism.

In 1998 he became a candidate cosmonaut and, in 1999, realised Biomechanics Noordung, the first complete theatre production in zero gravity conditions.

In 2005 he staged the first reprise of Noordung 1995–2005–2045. The second reprise willtake place in 2015.

In the 1980s he constructed retro-gardist events and observatories. In the 1990s he constructed informances. Since 2000 he has been constructing post-gravitational theatrical abstracts.

Selected theatrical productions
Odilo, 2018
Forbidden Theatre, 2008
Biomechanics Noordung, 1999
Noordung 1995–2045, 1995
Baptism Under Triglav, 1986

Selected theatre festivals
Supremat, Helix, Dublin, 2004
Noordung Prayer Machine, Kampnagel, Hamburg,1994
Zenith, Theater der Welt, Essen, 1991

Selected informances
TRG, Brussels, 2006
Helsey Gallery, Charleston, 2002
Art Nouveau, Bologna,1999

References

External links
 POSTGRAVITY ART
 ZAVOD DELAK 
 MEHATRON
 UMBOT
 NOORDUNG.NET 

1960 births
Living people
Slovenian theatre directors
People from Ilirska Bistrica